Ivan Casey (February 14, 1901 – May 31, 1976) was a provincial politician from Alberta, Canada. He served as a member of the Legislative Assembly of Alberta from 1944 to 1955, sitting with the Social Credit caucus in government.

References

Alberta Social Credit Party MLAs
1976 deaths
1901 births